Sam John Farrar (born June 29, 1978) is an American musician. He is best known as a member of the pop rock band Maroon 5, in which he plays several instruments, primarily bass guitar. A frequent collaborator with the band since the 1990s, he joined as a touring member in 2012 and was promoted to an official member in 2016. He has also been the bassist for the rock band Phantom Planet since their formation in 1994.

Career

1994–2012: Phantom Planet and other side projects 
Farrar is the bass guitar player for the American rock band Phantom Planet. He also joined the band Operation Aloha with members of Gomez and Maroon 5. He and his wife, Stephanie, have started their own music project, called Bubble and Strife.

2012–present: Maroon 5 
In 2012, Farrar became a touring member of Maroon 5, playing various instruments, including guitars, occasional bass guitar, percussion and additional keyboards, singing backing vocals and providing samples and other special effects (using the MPC).

A longtime collaborator of the band, he co-wrote and co-produced a few of the band's songs on almost all of their studio albums and also remixed one of their songs, which is called "Woman", on Call and Response: The Remix Album, released in 2008. On August 31, 2012 – during a show in Argentina on the Overexposed Tour – Farrar filled-in for Mickey Madden on the bass guitar for the first time since 2001. He subsequently filled-in for Madden on the next few shows of the tour.

After touring with the band as a touring member for the next couple of years, Farrar appeared in an official, promotional photo of Maroon 5 for the first time, in late 2016. He is also featured on the cover of the band's sixth studio album, Red Pill Blues (2017) – all of this can be seen as confirmation, that Farrar became an official member of Maroon 5, making them a seven-piece band. He replaced Madden as bassist in 2020 following the former's departure from the band.

Personal life 
Farrar was born in Los Angeles, California, to Australian parents. His father, John Farrar, was a member of The Shadows and also carved a successful songwriting career, penning many of Olivia Newton-John's big hits as well as producing nearly every one of her albums during her most successful years. His mother, Pat Carroll, was a successful Australian pop singer in the 1960s. He attended The Buckley School.

Sam is married to Stephanie Eitel, formerly a member of the band Agent Sparks. Their daughter Vesper Pearl Farrar was born on August 6, 2009, and their son Flynn Roscoe Farrar was born on January 14, 2014.

He graduated Pitzer College.

Discography 

With Hanson
 Underneath (2004)

With Operation Aloha
 Operation Aloha (2009)

With Sara Bareilles
 Kaleidoscope Heart (2010)
 Once Upon Another Time (EP) (2012)

With Bubble and Strife
 My Lifetime for Blondes (EP) (2011)

With Jasmine Ash
 Beneath the Noise (2012)

With John Travolta and Olivia Newton-John
This Christmas (2012)

With Oh Land
Wish Bone (2013)

With Tony Lucca
With the Whole World Watching (2013)

With Rozzi Crane
 Rozzi Crane (EP) (2013)
 Space (EP) (2015)
 Time (EP) (2015)

With Shoffy
 Lenses (2018)
 Cool Again (2020)

With Andy Grammer
 Naive (2019)

With Yuna
 Rogue (2019)

With SuperM
 Super One (2020)

With Duncan Laurence
 Small Town Boy (2020)

With Band of Horses
 Things Are Great (2022)

With Mandy Moore
 In Real Life (2022)

Maroon 5 

As an outside collaborator
 Songs About Jane (2002) – programming ("She Will Be Loved")
 It Won't Be Soon Before Long (2007) – production
 Call and Response: The Remix Album (2008) – remix of a song ("Woman")
 Hands All Over (2010) – songwriting ("Misery", "Stutter", "Don't Know Nothing", "Hands All Over" and "How")
 Songs About Jane: 10th Anniversary Edition (2012) – producing
As a touring member
 Overexposed (2012) – production and songwriting ("Ladykiller", "Fortune Teller" and "Tickets"), backing vocals, programming
 V (2014) – backing vocals ("Unkiss Me" and "This Summer" – the latter song is from the 2015 re-release of V), programming
As an official member
 Red Pill Blues (2017) – producing, keyboards, bass guitar, synthesizer, samples, lead and rhythm guitar, programming, backing vocals
 Jordi (2021) – producing, keyboards, bass guitar, synthesizer, samples, lead and rhythm guitar, programming, backing vocals

Phantom Planet 

 Phantom Planet Is Missing (1998)
 The Guest (2002)
 Phantom Planet (2004)
 Raise the Dead (2008)
 Devastator (2020)

Remixes 

2008
 "Woman" – Maroon 5 (Sam Farrar Remix)

2010
 "Unspoken" – Weezer (Sam Farrar Remix)

References

External links 

Living people
American rock bass guitarists
American male bass guitarists
American people of Australian descent
Planetshakers members
1978 births
Phantom Planet members
Maroon 5 members
21st-century American bass guitarists